"Typical Me" is a song by London rapper Kano, the second single taken from his debut album Home Sweet Home (2005). The track features vocals from Ghetts and marks Kano's first appearance in the UK Singles Chart.

Track listing

Charts

References

Kano (rapper) songs
2005 singles
Song recordings produced by Fraser T. Smith
2005 songs
Songs written by Kano (rapper)
679 Artists singles